Sofia Maldonado (born 1984) is a Puerto Rican contemporary artist. She lives and works between New York City and Puerto Rico. Maldonado has collaborated with the Nuyorican Movement.

Biography
Sofia Maldonado was born and raised in San Juan, Puerto Rico. Her love for art manifested at a very young age. It was at the Liga del Arte in Old San Juan where she took her first formal art classes. Later, she attended junior high and high school at Central High of Visual Arts in Santurce.

She received a BFA from the Escuela de Artes Plásticas (2006) in San Juan, a Master of Fine Arts from the Pratt Institute in 2008, and was a fellow at the Vermont Studio Center. In 2008, Maldonado exhibited at Queens Museum. In 2009 Maldonado created a large scale public art work with Real Art Ways in Hartford, Connecticut.

This artist, who shares her life between New York and Puerto Rico, is prolific and involved in numerous artistic and community projects with a social dimension. Maldonado was selected by the Times Square Alliance to create a mural on 42nd Street in Manhattan in 2010. Maldonado has painted an expansive body of work including skateparks, murals, live painting performances, mix media, and video. Her work is inspired by dilapidated structures of the Caribbean, the Latina female character, and urban subcultures. Her murals, her immediately-recognizable style and her freshness make her one of “the most well-known young artists in Puerto Rico, with an accelerated trajectory who puts forward the themes and work techniques of many emerging artists”, the director of the MAC Marianne Ramírez Aponte adds.

Her work has been featured in solo exhibitions internationally, including Magnan Emrich, New York (2008), Witzenhausen Gallery, Amsterdam (2010), Museo de Arte Contemporáneo, Puerto Rico (2010), Magnan Metz Gallery, NY (2010), Ringling Museum, Sarasota (2011), and the University of Wisconsin, Madison (2011). Her works are held in the collections of the Museo de Bellas Artes in Cuba; the Museo de Arte Contemporáneo in San Juan, Puerto Rico; and Rockefeller Brothers, New York, among others.

Book chapters and articles
  Fever : Tropical Nostalgias and Urban Anxieties in Sofia Maldonado (June 24, 2012).
 "Arts Innovator: Sofia Maldonado, Puerto Rico." Americas Quarterly (Fall 2009).
 Daley, Anna. "That's Not Us." Art21 Blog, April 5, 2010.
 Delgado, Cindy. "Sofia Maldonado: Beauty In Naughtiness." Rubyhornet April 29, 2010.
 McLendon, Matthew. Beyond Bling: Voices of Hip Hop in Art. Scala Publishers, 2011. 
 Morrison, Sarah. "Sofia Maldonado Gets Pretty/Hood in Times Square." (video and article) 80sPurple.
 Nogueras, Celina. Frescos: 50 Puerto Rican Artists under 35.  Actar, 2011. 
 Rivera, Raquel Z. "Sofia's Gatas / Las gatas de Sofía." Reggaetonica July 8, 2009.
 "Tropical Storm: Gowanus – Sofia Maldonado and Cre8tive YouTH*ink." (video) cre8tive YouTH*ink. June 13, 2011.
 "Vigoroso Letargo: Sofía Maldonado y Darren Brass hablarán hoy, a las 7:00 p.m., de historia y memoria en el MAC." El Nuevo Día, July 28, 2010.

Solo exhibitions
 2017
“Sofia Maldonado: Fem Trap” at Point Green
 2013
Into Gray, Magnan Metz Gallery, New York, NY
 2012
Fever: Tropical Nostalgias and Urban Anxieties in Sofia Maldonado, Museo Arte Contemporaneo de Puerto Rico
Isaac Lincoln Gallery at Northern State University, Aberdeen, SD
 2011
Disillusions, Studio Theater Gallery, Middlesex County College, Edison, NJ
University of Wisconsin, Madison
Cornell, Fine Arts Museum Rollins College, Winterpark, FL
 2010
Concrete Jungle Divas, Magnan Metz Gallery, New York, NY
Witzenhausen Gallery, Amsterdam, The Netherlands
Times Square Alliance Mural Project, New York, NY
CIRCA Puerto Rico, Magnan Metz Gallery, New York, NY
 2009
Graffiti Gone Global (during Art Basel Miami), Sushi Samba, Miami, FL
Taller Puertorriqueno, Philadelphia, PA
Skate my Patria, part of the Tenth Havana Biennial, Havana, Cuba
CIRCA Puerto Rico, Magnan Projects, New York, NY
 2008
Pinta, Special Artist Project, New York, NY
 2007
The Tropical Storm, Magnan Gallery New York, NY
 2006
Sofia... en la isla, Galeria Candela San Juan, Puerto Rico

Group exhibitions
 2013
Wood in Contemporary Art, Craft & Design, Museum of Arts and Design, New York, NY
 2012
Purple, Causey Contemporary, Brooklyn, NY
Concrete Illusions: Public and Private Spaces in Puerto Rico: Exploring the urban dimensions of the Caribbean, La Galeria de IBA at the Villa Victoria Center for the Arts, Boston, MA
 2011
The John and Mable Ringling Museum of Art, Sarasota, FL
The (S) Files, El Museo Bienal, New York, NY
 2010
Eames Inspirations, Barney, New York, NY
Paper olls, M.I.S.S in association with Fifty24 Gallery, Los Angeles, CA
 2009
"The Good, the Bad, & the Ugly", Queens museum of Art, New York
Girl by Girls, SPacejunk Gallery, St. Maurice; Bayone; and Grenoble, France
Hybridity, SOMArts Cultural Center, San Francisco, CA
 2008
V Certamen de Pintura Diputacion de Castellon, Spain
En Sus Marcuas, Instituto de Cultura Puertorriquena, Puerto Rico
Younity: Heart and Soul, Alphabeta, Greenpoint, NY
Graduate Show '08, Pratt Manhattan Gallery, NY
MFA Exchange, Virginia Commonwealth, Richmond, VA
 2007
M4 Design Project, Design District, Miami, FL
Coca-Cola Graffiti Series, Museo de Arte de Puerto Rico, Santurce, Puerto Rico
Hoy, Black Box Art Foundation, San Juan, Puerto Rico
 2006
São Paulo - Sao Juan, (with Os Gemeos, Dzine & Cudy Hudson) Museo de Arte de Puerto Rico, Puerto Rico
Paint Flash, Montana Gallery, Sevilla, Spain
Returned Mail, Galeria Carlos Irizarry, San Juan, Puerto Rico
 2005
Mural Painting, Galeria Comercial, Santurce, Puerto Rico
Sofia, Cafe Seda, San Juan, Puerto Rico
Nothing, Tag Rom, Rio Piedras, Puerto Rico
Annual Exhibition, Escuela de Artes Plásticas, San Juan, Puerto Rico
Juni, Bik, Sofia, Galeria Carlos Irizarry, Puerto Rico
Papa Jac Collectable Series, Don Pablo, Puerto Rico
 2004
Truck (at Luna St.), Sin Titulo Galeria de Arte Contemporaneo, San Juan, Puerto Rico

Awards
 2010
Rockefeller Brothers Fund an Times Square Alliance, public project, NY
 2009
Cuban Artist Fund, studio program at Chashama, NY
Vermont Studio Center, Vermont

Against the grain

References

External links
 Official Website
 Sofia Maldonado on Facebook

American contemporary artists
Living people
1984 births
People from San Juan, Puerto Rico
Pratt Institute alumni